This article lists railway stations both in the Republic of Ireland and Northern Ireland. The stations in the Republic of Ireland are generally operated by Iarnród Éireann and stations in Northern Ireland are generally operated by NI Railways.

Information for stations in the Republic of Ireland are sourced from Irish Rail's API, along with stations in Northern Ireland served by the Enterprise. Other stations in Northern Ireland source their station codes from the 2019 Irish Rail Fares Book.

Table

See also 
 List of closed railway stations in Ireland

References

External links 
 (EireTrains) - Irish Railway Station Photo Archive